Gilbert is a surname. Notable people with the surname include: 
Adrian Gilbert (military writer) (born 1954), author and military historian
Alan Gilbert (Australian academic) (1944-2010), Australian, President and BR Vice Chancellor of the University of Manchester
Alan Gilbert (conductor) (born 1967), American conductor
Alex Gilbert (adoption advocate) (born 1992), New Zealand adoption advocate
Alfred Gilbert (1854–1934), English sculptor and goldsmith
Alfred Carlton Gilbert (1884–1961), American inventor, athlete, toy-maker and businessman
Alvarus E. Gilbert (1825–1891), American farmer and politician
Amy Gilbert (1895–1980), American historian
Anthony Gilbert (composer) British composer
Arthur Gilbert (triathlete) (1921–2015), English triathlon competitor
Arthur Hill Gilbert (1894–1970), American Impressionist painter
Arik Gilbert (born 2002), American football player
Augustin Nicolas Gilbert (1858–1927), French physician and medical researcher
Barrie Gilbert (1937-2020), English-born electronics engineer, inventor of the Gilbert cell
Bartholomew Gilbert (died 1603), English explorer, sailor, captain
Benjamin Gilbert (died 1780), Pennsylvania settler captured by Indians
Billy Gilbert (1894–1971), American comedian and actor
Billy Gilbert (baseball) (1876–1927), American baseball player
Billy Gilbert (silent film actor) (1891–1961), American silent-film actor and director
Brad Gilbert (born 1961), American tennis coach, television tennis commentator, and former professional tennis player
Brantley Gilbert (born 1985), American country singer, songwriter
Bruce Gilbert (born 1946), English musician
Cass Gilbert (1859–1934), American architect
Chad Gilbert (born 1981), American musician and record producer
Chaleeda Gilbert (born 2001), Thai singer and actress
Charles Henry Gilbert (1859–1928), American ichthyologist
Dana Gilbert (born 1959), American tennis player
Daniel Gilbert (disambiguation)
David Gilbert (disambiguation)
Davies Gilbert (1767–1839), British engineer, author, and politician
Dennis Gilbert (disambiguation)
Dorothée Gilbert (born 1983), étoile at the Ballet de l'Opéra National de Paris
Ed Gilbert (1931–1999), American actor
Eddie Gilbert (cricketer) (1905-1978), Queensland Aboriginal cricketer 
Edgar Gilbert (1923–2013), American mathematician and coding theorist
Edouard-Jean Gilbert (1888–1954), French mycologist
Edward Joseph Gilbert (born 1936), American-born Catholic Archbishop of Port of Spain, Trinidad and Tobago
Elena Gilbert (Fictional Character in television series, The Vampire Diaries, portrayed by Nina Dobrev
Elizabeth Gilbert (born 1969), American novelist
Elmer G. Gilbert (1930–2019), control systems engineer
Ethel Gilbert, American expert in the risks of radiation-induced cancer
Fabiola Cabeza de Baca Gilbert (1894–1991), American educator and author
Felix Gilbert (1905–1991), German-born American historian
Gale Gilbert (born 1961), American football quarterback
Garrett Gilbert (born 1991), American football player
George B. Gilbert, longtime pastor of Emmanuel Church (Killingworth, Connecticut), author of Forty Years a Country Preacher
George G. Gilbert (1849–1909), U.S. Representative from Kentucky
George Gilbert (Jesuit) (1559–1583), English Roman Catholic convert and activist
Glenroy Gilbert (born 1968), former Canadian athlete
Glyn Gilbert (1920–2003), English Major-General in Bermuda
Greg Gilbert (born 1962), Canadian former ice hockey player
Grove Karl Gilbert (1843–1918), American geologist
Gustave Gilbert (1911–1977), American psychologist
Helen Gilbert (1922–2012), American artist
Helen Gilbert (1915–1995), American actress
Henry F. Gilbert (1868–1928), American composer
Herb Gilbert (1888–1972), Australian rugby footballer
Herb Gilbert, Jr. (1917–1983), Australian rugby league footballer
Herschel Burke Gilbert (1918–2003), composer
Homer Gilbert (1909–1943), American football player
Humphrey Gilbert (c. 1537–1583), English adventurer
Jackson Gilbert (born 1992), lawyer, expert in Super Smash brothers, footballer, co-author
Jack Gilbert (disambiguation)
James Gilbert (disambiguation)
Jane Gilbert (born 1920), American actress
Jean Gilbert (1879–1942), German operetta composer
Jessie Gilbert (1987–2006), British chess player
Joanne Gilbert (born 1932), American television and film actress
John Gilbert (disambiguation)
Johnny Gilbert (born 1924), game show announcer
Jordan Gilbert (born 1990), American professional Counter-Strike player
Kenneth Gilbert (1931–2020), Canadian harpsichordist
Kenneth Gilbert (actor) (1931–2015), English actor
Kent Gilbert (born 1952), American actor in Japan
Kerrea Gilbert (born 1987), English footballer
Kieran Gilbert, Australian journalist and television presenter
Kristen Gilbert (born 1967), American serial killer nurse
Larry Gilbert (disambiguation)
Lewis Gilbert (1920–2018), British film director
Logan Gilbert (born 1997), American professional baseball player
Mads Gilbert (born 1947), Norwegian doctor
Marcus Gilbert (disambiguation)
Mary Ann Gilbert (c. 1776–1845), agronomist
Matt Gilbert (born 1985), English rugby league footballer
Matt Gilbert (academic) (born 1978), American historian
Melissa Gilbert (born 1964), American actress
Mark Gilbert (born 1956), former Baseball player and United States ambassador to New Zealand
Mark Gilbert (American football) (born 1997), American football player
Michael Gilbert (disambiguation)
Paul Gilbert (born 1966), American guitarist
Philippe Gilbert (born 1982), Belgian road bicycle racer
Peggy Gilbert (1905–2007), American jazz saxophonist and bandleader
Rhod Gilbert (born 1968), Welsh comedian
Richard Gilbert (disambiguation)
Robert Gilbert (disambiguation)
Rod Gilbert (1941–2021), Canadian-American ice hockey player
Ron Gilbert, American video-game designer
Ronnie Gilbert (1926–2015), American folk-singer
Ruby Gilbert (1929–2010), American politician
Sam Gilbert (Australian footballer) (born 1986), Australian rules footballer
Sandra Gilbert (born 1936), American professor, literary critic and poet
Sara Gilbert (born 1975), American actress
Seymour Parker Gilbert (1892–1938), American lawyer, banker, politician and diplomat
Simon Gilbert (disambiguation)
Sky Gilbert (born 1952), Canadian writer, actor, academic and drag performer
Thomas Gilbert (disambiguation)
Tim Gilbert (journalist) (born 1967), Australian journalist
Timothy Gilbert (1797–1865), American piano manufacturer, abolitionist and religious organizer
Todd Gilbert (born 1970), American politician from Virginia
Tyler Gilbert (born 1993), American baseball player
Ulysees Gilbert III (born 1997), American football player
Walter Gilbert (born 1932), American Nobel Prize (biology) recipient
William Gilbert (disambiguation)
William Schwenk Gilbert (1836–1911), English dramatist, librettist, poet and illustrator
Zyon Gilbert (born 1999), American football player

See also
Gilbert (disambiguation)

English-language surnames
Surnames of Norman origin